The Eastern Okraina was a local government that existed in the Russian Far East region in 1920 during the Russian Civil War of 1917–1923.

In 1919  White forces in Western Siberia were defeated by the Bolsheviks. On 4 January 1920, the White Movement Supreme Ruler of Russia, Alexander Kolchak, issued an order transferring to ataman Grigory Semyonov "the whole civil and military power on the territory of Russia eastern outskirts".

Based on this order, on 16 January 1920, Grigory Semyonov announced in  Chita the creation of the "Government of the Russian Eastern Outskirts", with Sergey Taskin as its head. Semyonov's actions were supported by the commanders of  Japanese troops in Siberia.

On 6 April 1920, a hastily convened Constituent Assembly gathered at Verkhneudinsk and proclaimed the establishment of a separate administration: the  Far Eastern Republic (FER). On May 14, Japanese commanders agreed to talk with the Bolshevik-oriented FER, and on May 24 negotiations began at  Railway Station, 125 Kilometers west of Chita. The Japanese insisted that the Government of the Russian Eastern Outskirts should be an equal party during the negotiations for the creation of a united Far East government, but the FER disagreed, and negotiations were stopped in early June.

On July 3, 1920, Japan issued a proclamation about evacuating Japanese troops from Siberia. Semyonov understood that he could not survive without Japanese support. He asked the Japanese government to delay the evacuation for four months, and tried to negotiate a merger with the Government of Zemstvo of Maritime Territory, but unsuccessfully.

The Gongota negotiations resumed on July 10, 1920, and on July 17 the FER representatives and Japanese military officials in Siberia signed the  Gongota Agreement. The agreed terms provided for Japanese evacuation from the Transbaikal and the establishment of a neutral border zone between the territories of the parties. The Whites understood that they could not stop the Reds without Japanese support, and began to retreat to the southeast, preparing to retreat into Chinese territory. Only small White military forces still held Chita, blocking the  Trans-Siberia Railway.

At the same time military forces of the FER, masked as independent groups of  partisans, began to move through the neutral zone towards Chita; on September 15, an assembly of workers of the Eastern Transbaikal Region in Nerchinsk proclaimed the creation of a Regional Revolution committee for the eastern Transbaikal. On October 15, Japanese troops left Chita, and the Reds demanded the capitulation of the Whites' garrison there. The Whites declined, and on October 19 the Reds began to advance on Chita, which they captured on October 22. On October 25 the government of the FER moved from Verkhneudinsk to Chita. At the end of October, the Provisional Eastern-Transbaikal Assembly, during a joint session with the Nerchinsk Regional Revolution Committee, declared its own dissolution, and three Far Eastern pro-Soviet governments joined in the united FER. The Eastern Okraina, left without territory, collapsed, and Semyonov and his remaining troops went into exile in Chinese territory.

References

1920 disestablishments in Russia
Former countries in East Asia
White Russia
History of Northeast Asia
History of the Russian Far East
States and territories established in 1920
States and territories disestablished in 1920
Japan–Soviet Union relations
Provisional governments of the Russian Civil War